Martin Popplewell is an English journalist and broadcaster who has presented on the BBC News Channel, BBC World, Sky News and Five News.  He runs a PR Consultancy Coconut Communications which specialises in Media Training.

Early life and education
Popplewell was born in and attended school in Cambridge. He was educated at University College London, from which he obtained a degree in zoology. Before joining the BBC, Popplewell was a researcher for Alan Duncan MP at the House of Commons. He also worked for U.S. Congressman Richard Gephardt in Washington DC and as a volunteer on President Bill Clinton's election campaign.

Journalism career
Popplewell began his career as a journalist on the BBC's news trainee scheme. His break into TV came when he was just 15 years old:  he saw the film The Blue Lagoon and decided he too wanted to live as a castaway on a completely uninhabited Pacific Island with just one woman for company. He returned to his teenage desert island in the Ulithi atoll to make a documentary The Real Castaway. The programme was transmitted on Boxing Day 2001 and won wide critical acclaim, being described by The Sunday Times as one of the must watched programmes over Christmas.

Popplewell has presented the news on Five, BBC News and Sky News. He also fronted the lifestyle magazine show Five News at Breakfast. The programme was a mix of showbiz news, lifestyle features and movie reviews. He has reported for ITN and worked as a political reporter for the BBC's On the Record.

He has also presented on LBC 97.3.

Personal life
Popplewell is an experienced scuba diver and has written travel features on the subject for The Times.

References

External links 
 www.martinpopplewell.com

Year of birth missing (living people)
Living people
People from Cambridge
English reporters and correspondents
Sky News newsreaders and journalists
English television presenters
Alumni of University College London